Luis Fazio (born 23 April 1911, date of death unknown) was an Argentine footballer. He played in two matches for the Argentina national football team in 1937. He was also part of Argentina's squad for the 1937 South American Championship.

References

External links
 

1911 births
Year of death missing
Argentine footballers
Argentina international footballers
Place of birth missing
Association football defenders
Club Atlético Independiente footballers
Club Nacional de Football players
Argentine expatriate footballers
Expatriate footballers in Uruguay